The 1914–15 NHA season was the sixth season of the National Hockey Association and played from December 26, 1914, until March 3, 1915. Each team played 20 games. The Ottawa Senators won the NHA championship in a two-game, total goal playoff against the Montreal Wanderers. The Senators, however fell to the Vancouver Millionaires of the Pacific Coast Hockey Association in the Stanley Cup championship. It was the second 'World's Series' between the NHA and the PCHA for the Stanley Cup.

League business

Directors
 Emmett Quinn, president
 Frank Calder, secretary-treasurer

Rule changes

At a meeting on March 30, 1914, held with the PCHA executives, the league decided:

 adopt the lines separating the three zones for off-side purposes
 to continue in six-man hockey, while the PCHA will continue in seven-man hockey
 to drop fines in general for infractions and use minutes off
 no player to come within five feet of players facing off
 no face-offs closer than 10 feet from the goaltender
 puck played after rebounding from goalkeeper no longer is offside

Source: Toronto Globe

At the November meeting of the league, the NHA decided:

 charging a player into the boards is a major foul,
 match foul penalized by 10 minutes off and $15 fine.

Pre-season

Along with Montreal Nationals president A. L. Caron, player Art Ross attempted to organize a new hockey league with teams in Ottawa, Montreal, Toronto and Boston. The arena owners in all of the cities turned down the new league and killed the idea. Ross was suspended by the NHA, but by January 7, Mr. Ross was reinstated. He signed with Ottawa.

Regular season

The Ontarios changed their team name to Shamrocks from the February 3 game forward.

Ottawa traded Percy LeSueur to the Ontarios for Fred Lake.

Highlights

A record long overtime game was played in Quebec on January 13 between Quebec and the Canadiens. Quebec defeated Montreal 3–2 after 50 minutes and 28 seconds of overtime, on a goal by Jack McDonald. Coach Jack Laviolette had to take over for Georges Vezina after Vezina was penalized.

The Ontarios had to forfeit their February 3 game with the Wanderers after the McNamara brothers took a personal leave to attend their fathers' funeral. Owner Eddie Livingstone of the Ontarios asked for a postponement but the Wanderers refused.

A game on February 17 between Toronto and Ottawa turned into a brawl before Toronto police arrested Art Ross and Roy McGiffen to calm the proceedings.

Final standings

Playoffs

League championship
Montreal and Ottawa played a two-game total-goals series to determine the league championship. In the first game, Ottawa's  Art Ross scored in the first period to give the Senators the lead which they would not relinquish. In the second, Angus Duford scored to push the lead to 2–0 after two periods, and Horace Merrill and Jack Darragh scored to make it 4–0. In the second game, the Wanderers' Donald Smith scored in the second period, but the Senators held the Wanderers off with tight checking to win the series 4–1 on goals.

For the win, Ottawa was awarded the O'Brien Cup. Since the NHA champion of 1914 was the defending champion of the Stanley Cup, Ottawa now took possession and defence of the Stanley Cup as well. The Senators engraved their series win over the Wanderers on the Stanley Cup and travelled to Vancouver for the world championship series against the Vancouver Millionaires.

Exhibition series
The Wanderers, Canadiens and Bulldogs played an exhibition series in New York and Boston. The Ontarios and Torontos played an exhibitions series in Cleveland, Ohio.

Stanley Cup Final

As the 1914 Final was held in Toronto, all three games in this series were played at the arena of the PCHA's champion in Vancouver, British Columbia. The Millionaires swept the best-of-five series in three games.

Awards
 O'Brien Cup - Ottawa Senators

Schedule and results

† Defaulted to Wanderers.

Source: Coleman, pp. 272–273.

Player statistics

Scoring leaders

Goaltending averages

See also
1914–15 PCHA season
National Hockey Association
List of pre-NHL seasons
List of Stanley Cup champions

References

Bibliography

Notes

1914–15 in Canadian ice hockey by league
National Hockey Association seasons